This is a list of nature centres and environmental education centres in Canada.

Alberta

British Columbia

Manitoba

New Brunswick

Newfoundland

Nova Scotia

Ontario

Prince Edward Island

Quebec

Saskatchewan

See also
List of nature centers in the United States

References

Nature centres

Nature centres
Canada
Nature centres